Locking may refer to:

 Locking (computer science)
 Locking, Somerset, a village and civil parish in the United Kingdom
 RAF Locking, a former Royal Air Force base
 Locking Castle, a former castle
 Brian Locking (born 1938), rock guitarist
 Norm Locking (1911–1995), National Hockey League player
 Locking (dance), a style of funk dance invented in the early 1970s
 Prevention of a screw thread from turning when undesired

See also 
 Lockin (disambiguation)
 Lock (disambiguation)